Living Legends, originally the Lamanite Generation, is a song and dance performing group at Brigham Young University made up of performers of Native American, Polynesian and Hispanic or Latino origin. They perform dances that originate in these cultures as well. Living Legends was formed in 1971 by Janie Thompson.

History
Living Legends originally started as the Lamanite Generation which was an all-Native American performing group organized by Janie Thompson. The organization was first formed in 1971 and their first tour was across Indian reservations. They toured the Eastern United States in 1974 and they toured in Central and South American the following year. Thompson stated that the 1975 tour was, "the most significant tour in [her] entire career", because it impacted and influenced Native Americans south of the United States. Living Legends has performed around the world including China and the 1992 International Expo in Seville, Spain.

In the 1970s, the group was noted for its closing song at most performances "Go My Son", written by Arliene Nofchissey and Carnes Burson. The song encourages Native Americans to receive an education. This idea comes from the Navajo chief Manuelito who urged Native Americans to obtain an education. Native communities did not always see this message from the Lamanite Generation positively.

The transition to its current name was a long drawn out process. For example, in 1991 they still were using the name "Lamanite Generation" but performed a program entitled "Living Legends". Professor and historian Jared Farmer considers that BYU may have changed the name of the group to "Living Legends" to avoid racism associated with the word "Lamanite".

Tour history
This tour history begins in 1971 and ends in 2019.

1971–72 Florida, Southern California, Idaho, Wyoming, Washington, Alberta, British Columbia, Saskatchewan
1972–73 Southern California, Arizona, Idaho, Kansas, Montana, Nebraska, North Dakota, Oklahoma, South Dakota, Texas, Wyoming, Alberta, Saskatchewan
1973–74 Arkansas, Colorado, Delaware, Florida, Illinois, Kansas, Mississippi, Nevada, New Hampshire, New Jersey, New York, North Carolina, Ohio, Oklahoma, South Carolina, Tennessee, Virginia, Wisconsin, Germany
1974–75 Alberta, Saskatchewan, Oklahoma, British Columbia, Bolivia, Brazil, Colombia, Costa Rica, Ecuador, Guatemala, Mexico, Panama, Peru, Uruguay, Venezuela
1975–76 Ohio, Nevada, Arizona, California, Colorado, Florida, Georgia, Idaho, Indiana, Michigan, New Mexico, New York, Pennsylvania, Tennessee, Texas, Vermont, Virginia, Washington D.C., Ontario, Quebec
1976–77 Arizona, Southern California, Nevada, Idaho, Washington, Minnesota, South Dakota, North Dakota, Montana, Canada
1977–78 Colorado, Arizona, Denmark, Sweden, Norway, Finland
1978–79 Nevada, Wyoming, Montana, Alberta, Colorado, New Mexico, Texas, Louisiana, Florida, South Carolina, North Carolina, Georgia, Tennessee, Arkansas, Oklahoma
1979–80 Southern California, Nevada, Romania, Hungary, Poland
1980–81 Arizona, Idaho, Oregon, Washington, Idaho, Illinois, Indiana, Iowa, Michigan, Nebraska, New York, North Dakota, Ohio, Washington, Alberta, British Columbia, Manitoba, Ontario, Quebec, Saskatchewan
1981–82 Arizona, Northern California, Nevada, People's Republic of China, Hong Kong, Philippines, Taiwan, Hawaii
1982–83 New Mexico, Arizona, North Dakota, South Dakota, England, Belgium, Germany, Switzerland, Denmark
1984–85 Wyoming, Montana, Alabama, Arkansas, Florida, Georgia, Louisiana, Mississippi, New Mexico, Oklahoma, Tennessee, Texas, Mexico 
1985–86 Arizona, Australia, New Zealand, Fiji, Hawaii
1986–87 California, Oregon, Dominican Republic, Ecuador, Jamaica, Puerto Rico, Florida
1987–88 New Mexico, German Democratic Republic, Federal Republic of Germany
1988–89 Southern California, Nevada, Croatia, Czech Republic, Slovakia, Slovenia, Hungary, Germany
1989–90 Northern California, Nevada, Alberta, British Columbia, Manitoba, Saskatchewan, Idaho, Minnesota, Washington
1990–91 Arizona, Croatia, Czech Republic, Slovakia, Austria, Germany
1991–92 Idaho, Oregon, Washington, People's Republic of China, Thailand, Hong Kong, Taiwan
1992–93 Idaho, Montana, Wyoming, Guatemala, Honduras, Mexico, Texas
1993–94 New Mexico, Texas, Illinois, Minnesota, Nebraska, North Dakota, South Dakota, Wisconsin, Wyoming
1994–95 California, Bulgaria, Czech Republic, Romania, Slovakia, Austria
1995–96 Nevada, California, Austria, Germany, Italy, Croatia, Slovenia
1996–97 Colorado, New Mexico, Wyoming, Tahiti, Western Samoa, Cook Islands, New Zealand, Hawaii
1997–98 Arizona, Missouri, Illinois, Michigan, Ohio, Pennsylvania, New York, Vermont, Maine, Massachusetts, Connecticut, New Jersey, Ontario, Quebec
1998–99 Nevada, California, Denmark, Norway, Sweden
1999–2000 Washington, Idaho, Oregon, Argentina, Brazil, Paraguay, Uruguay
2000–01 Nevada, California, South Dakota, North Dakota, Alberta, British Columbia, Manitoba, Ontario, Saskatchewan
2001–02 Alaska
2002–03 New Mexico
2003–04 Alaska, Idaho, Washington, Oregon, South Africa
2004–05 Arizona, Nevada, California, Mexico
2005–06 Wyoming, Montana, Germany, Austria
2006–07 Alaska, Nevada, California, South Dakota, Iowa, North Dakota, Canada
2007–08 Colorado, Wyoming, Chile
2008–09 Arizona, Argentina, Paraguay, Uruguay
2009–10 China, Utah
2010–11 Russia, Washington, Idaho, Oregon, Alaska
2011–12 Utah, New Mexico, Arizona, California, Nauvoo, Illinois
2012–13 Guatemala, Honduras, Nicaragua
2013–14 California, Nevada, Nauvoo, Illinois
2014–15 New Mexico, Texas, Montana, Canada, Alaska
2015–16 New Zealand, Tonga, Samoa
2016–17 Idaho, Washington, Oregon
2017–18 Kansas, Missouri, Illinois, Wisconsin, Minnesota, North Dakota, Iowa, South Dakota, Nebraska
2018–19 Mexico, Colorado, Utah, Germany, Switzerland, Brazil

Recording
Go My Son (album)

References

External links
Living legends: maintaining a trans-cultural identity, 2019, L. Tom Perry Special Collections, Harold B. Lee Library, Brigham Young University
Performing Arts Management records on Living Legends, 1991–1994, 1997–1999, 2001–2004, L. Tom Perry Special Collections, Harold B. Lee Library, Brigham Young University
Group web page
LDS Music store link to Go My Son
BYU Records page for group

Brigham Young University
1971 establishments in Utah
Performing groups established in 1971
Harold B. Lee Library-related University Archives articles